Jet Age is the second studio album by Australian rock band The Superjesus. The album was released in October 2000 and peaked at number 5 in Australia. The album was re-released in November 2001 and was certified platinum in 2002.

Track listing

Charts

Weekly charts

Year-end charts

Certifications

Release history

References

2000 albums
The Superjesus albums
Albums produced by Ed Buller
Warner Music Group albums